Salvador María de Iturbide y Huarte (17 July 1820 – 7 June 1856) was the eighth child (and third son) of Agustín I of Mexico and Empress Ana Maria Huarte. He was married in 1845 to Doña María del Rosario de Marzán y Guisasola. His descendants, through his son Salvador de Iturbide y de Marzán, are the current pretenders to the Mexican Throne. He was in the Secretary Mexican Legation in Washington, D.C. in 1849.

Biography
Prince Salvador was two years old when he became a Mexican Prince and was styled Highness by the Mexican Congress. He had nine brothers and sisters;  Prince Imperial Agustín Jerónimo, Princess Sabina, Princess Juana, Princess Josefa, Prince Ángel, Princess María, Princess Dolores, Prince Felipe, and Prince Agustín Cosme. He was educated at Collège Sainte-Barbe, Paris, as well as in Vienna. 

Salvador was the third in line to the throne, after his brother Ángel de Iturbide y Huarte. When Maximilian I of Mexico was crowned emperor, he contacted the Iturbide family to ask for the adoption of two boys: His Highness, Agustín de Iturbide y Green, son of Ángel, and His Highness Salvador de Iturbide y Marzán, son of Salvador.

He drowned in a boating accident on the Tepic River, Nayarit, on 7 June 1856.

Decree
The Sovereign Mexican Constituent Congress decreed on June 22, 1822 the following:

Art 1 °. The Mexican Monarchy, in addition to being moderate and Constitutional, is also hereditary.
Art 2 °. Consequently, the Nation calls the succession of the Crown for the death of the current Emperor, his firstborn son Don Agustín Jerónimo de Iturbide. The Constitution of the Empire will decide the order of succession of the throne.
Art 3 °. The crown prince will be called "Prince Imperial" and will have the treatment of Imperial Highness.
Art 4 °. The legitimate sons and daughters of H.I.M will be called "Mexican Princes", and will have the treatment of Highness.
Art 5 °. Don José Joaquín de Iturbide y Arreguí, Father of H.I.M, is decorated with the title of "Prince of the Union" and the treatment of Highness, during his life.
Art 6 °. It is also granted the title of "Princess of Iturbide" and the treatment of Highness, during her life, to Doña María Nicolasa de Iturbide y Arámburo, sister of the Emperor.

Ancestry

References

Salvador
Mexican nobility
Iturbide y Huarte, Salvador
1820 births
1856 deaths
19th-century Mexican people
Accidental deaths in Mexico
Boating accident deaths
Sons of emperors

Nobility of the Americas